Sode Ramaiah (born 23 July 1943) is a leader of Communist Party of India from Andhra Pradesh. He served as member of the Lok Sabha representing Bhadrachalam. He was elected to 8th, 11th and 12th Lok Sabha.

References

India MPs 1984–1989
People from Khammam district
1943 births
Living people
Communist Party of India politicians from Andhra Pradesh
India MPs 1996–1997
India MPs 1998–1999
Lok Sabha members from Andhra Pradesh